Miyun railway station, formerly known as Miyun East railway station, is a railway station of Beijing-Shenyang high-speed railway located in Miyun District, Beijing, China. It was opened on 22 January 2021.

References

Railway stations in Beijing
Stations on the Beijing–Shenyang High-Speed Railway
Railway stations in China opened in 2021
Miyun District